Kishore Chandra Singh Deo was an Indian politician who served as Member of Odisha Legislative Assembly from Surada Assembly constituency.

Personal life 
He was born in 2 July 1961 and died in 28 May 2010. He died from heart attack. His spouse was Nandini Devi who served as MLA in Odisha Legislative Assembly. He was the son of Ananta Narayan Singh Deo who served as Ruler of Dharakote and Shanti Devi who served as MLA in Odisha Legislative Assembly.

References 

1961 births
2010 deaths
Bharatiya Janata Party politicians from Odisha
Odisha MLAs 2004–2009